Hyphomicrobium sulfonivorans is a bacterium from the genus of Hyphomicrobium which was isolated from garden soil in Warwickshire in England.

References

External links
Type strain of Hyphomicrobium sulfonivorans at BacDive -  the Bacterial Diversity Metadatabase
 

Hyphomicrobiales
Bacteria described in 2002